The Pond is a 1972 magic realist novel by Georgian writer Tamaz Chiladze. The novel is translated and published in former Eastern Bloc countries including Russia, Estonia and Poland.

References

External links
 The Pond in Goodreads.com

1972 novels
20th-century Georgian novels
Georgian magic realism novels
Psychological novels
Works by Tamaz Chiladze